Sir Felix Maximilian Schoenbrunn Cassel, 1st Baronet, PC, QC, JP (16 September 1869 – 22 February 1953) was a German-born British barrister and politician who served as Judge Advocate-General, the senior civilian lawyer of the War Office (and later also the Air Ministry) responsible for the administration of courts-martial, from 1915 to 1934.

Cassel was born into a Jewish family in Cologne, Germany. His father was Louis Schoenbrunn Cassel and his uncle was the philanthropist Sir Ernest Cassel. He was educated at Elstree School and Harrow School (1883–1888), and won a scholarship to Corpus Christi College, Oxford, where he obtained firsts in classical mods in 1891 and jurisprudence in 1892.

He was called to the Bar at Lincoln's Inn in 1894 and took silk in 1906, practising in Chancery. He became a bencher of Lincoln's Inn in 1912 and treasurer in 1935.

In 1907, he was elected to London County Council as Municipal Reform Party member for West St Pancras,  serving until 1910. In the December 1910 general election, he was elected to the House of Commons as Conservative member for St Pancras West, a seat he held until October 1916, when he resigned it by talking the Chiltern Hundreds. He had previously been defeated standing for Hackney Central in the January 1910 general election.

In 1914, he was commissioned into the 19th (County of London) Battalion (St Pancras), London Regiment, and served in France until August 1915, when he was recalled to London to assist the Judge Advocate-General. He was promoted to the temporary rank of captain on 21 June 1915. In October 1915 he was appointed Judge Advocate-General himself, despite opposition from some MPs, who were worried about his German origins. He resigned his commission on 7 October 1916.

Cassel was created a baronet in the 1920 New Year Honours. On 8 June 1937, he was sworn of the Privy Council, entitling him to the style "The Right Honourable".

He chaired the Board of Trade committee on compulsory insurance from 1935 to 1937. He was appointed an honorary fellow of Corpus Christi College, Oxford, in 1942, and was a member of the Council of Legal Education from 1943. He also took part in his family's philanthropic work, chairing the Cassel Educational Trust and the management committee of the Cassel Hospital. He was also a member of the council of the King Edward VII Sanatorium in Midhurst, Sussex. He was master of the Worshipful Company of Musicians from 1939 to 1944. He endowed three annual Cassel Scholarships at Lincoln's Inn. He was a justice of the peace for Hertfordshire and served as High Sheriff of Hertfordshire in 1942–1943.

On 18 November 1908, he married Lady Helen Grimston, daughter of the Earl of Verulam, who died in 1947. They had three sons and two daughters, one of whom, Josephine, married the physiologist and mountaineer Griffith Pugh in 1939. Cassel's county estate was at Putteridge Bury, near Luton. He died in hospital at Midhurst on 22 February 1953 aged 83 and was succeeded in the baronetcy by his son, Francis (1912–1969).

Footnotes

References 
 Biography, Oxford Dictionary of National Biography
 Obituary, The Times, 23 February 1953

1869 births
1953 deaths
London Regiment officers
British Army personnel of World War I
People educated at Elstree School
Alumni of Corpus Christi College, Oxford
Members of Lincoln's Inn
English King's Counsel
People educated at Harrow School
High Sheriffs of Hertfordshire
Members of London County Council
Baronets in the Baronetage of the United Kingdom
Members of the Privy Council of the United Kingdom
Conservative Party (UK) MPs for English constituencies
UK MPs 1910–1918
20th-century King's Counsel
19th-century German Jews
German emigrants to England
Fellows of Corpus Christi College, Oxford
Municipal Reform Party politicians
People from the Rhine Province
Naturalised citizens of the United Kingdom
Jewish British politicians
English people of German-Jewish descent
English Jews